Château Miranda, also known as Château de Noisy was a 19th-century neo-Gothic castle in Celles, province of Namur, Wallonia, Belgium, in the region of the Ardennes. As of October 2017, the château has been completely demolished.

History
The Château was planned and designed in 1866 by the English architect Edward Milner under commission from the Liedekerke-De Beaufort family, who had left their previous home, Vêves Castle, during the French Revolution. Milner died in 1884 before the Château was finished. Construction was completed in 1907 after the clock tower was erected.

Their descendants remained in occupation until World War II. A small portion of the Battle of the Bulge took place on the property, and it was during that time that the Château was occupied by German forces.

In 1950, Château Miranda was renamed "Château de Noisy" when it was taken over by the National Railway Company of Belgium (NMBS/SNCB) as an orphanage and also a holiday camp for sickly children. It lasted as a children's camp until the late 1970s.

The Château stood empty and abandoned since 1991 because the cost to maintain it was too great, and a search for investors in the property failed. Although the municipality of Celles had offered to take it over, the family refused, and the enormous building lingered in a derelict state, succumbing to decay and vandalism. Parts of the structure were heavily damaged in a fire, and many ceiling areas began collapsing. Despite this, it became a favourite venue for urban exploration.

Demolition of Château Miranda 
Demolition work began in 2016 amid concern over the structural stability of the building. The demolition took approximately a year, which began in October 2016 with the removal of the roof. By October 2017, the château had been completely demolished. The last part to be removed was the central tower.

Media
The Château was used as a filming location by the American television series Hannibal. The building is shown as Castle Lecter in Lithuania.
The château was also used as a filming location for the Belgian movie Het huis Anubis en de wraak van Arghus (English: The house of Anubis and the revenge of Arghus)

Gallery

See also

List of castles in Belgium

References

External links

 Opacity.us
 History and photos of Noisy Miranda Castle in English
 History and photos of Noisy Miranda Castle in English
 History and photos of Noisy Miranda Castle in French
 The History of Château de Noisy (Château Miranda) in English
 Photos of Noisy Miranda Castle from 2009
 Some history of the Château and evidence of the demolition in English
Looking back on Château Miranda - A demolished fairytale neo-Gothic castle in Belgium Photos and history, in English

Miranda
Miranda
Gothic Revival architecture in Belgium
Demolished buildings and structures in Belgium
Buildings and structures demolished in 2016
Building collapses in Belgium
Building collapses caused by fire